"Take My Breath Away" is a song written by Giorgio Moroder and Tom Whitlock for the 1986 film Top Gun, performed by American new wave band Berlin. It won the Academy Award for Best Original Song, as well as the Golden Globe Award for Best Original Song in 1986.

Background
Italian musician Giorgio Moroder was asked by Jerry Bruckheimer, the co-producer for Top Gun, to write a song for the film. He first wrote "Danger Zone" which was recorded by Kenny Loggins. Happy with the result, Bruckheimer then requested a slower song for a romantic scene. Once Moroder had written the musical backing to what would become "Take My Breath Away", he recorded a demo which featured a distinctive bass sound on a synthesiser that would later be used on the actual recording.  Moroder gave the demo to lyricist Tom Whitlock. The two first became acquainted when Whitlock, a mechanic, fixed the brakes on Moroder's Ferrari, and informed him that he was also a lyricist.  Whitlock wrote the lyrics while driving home from the studio, and then spent a few hours at home polishing them. A demo of the song, sung by a background singer, impressed director Tony Scott and producers Bruckheimer and Don Simpson, who decided to film new romantic scenes between Tom Cruise and Kelly McGillis to feature the song.

The song was first offered to The Motels, who much later released their original demo, which is fairly similar to Berlin's released version, on their compilation album Anthologyland (2001). Columbia Records suggested some of their signed artists, but eventually Moroder thought of the band Berlin, whose song "No More Words" he had produced. Whitlock made a few changes to the lyrics before Terri Nunn recorded the vocals. Moroder has said that of all the songs he has produced in his career, he is most proud of this song.

Releases and performances
"Take My Breath Away" was the second single from the Top Gun soundtrack album, following Kenny Loggins' "Danger Zone", and was released in 1986 as a split single alongside the song "Radar Radio", performed by Moroder featuring Joe Pizzulo.

The song peaked at number one on the Billboard Hot 100, and also topped the charts in the United Kingdom, the Netherlands, Ireland and Belgium. It later went on to win Best Original Song at the 59th Academy Awards.

"Take My Breath Away" is available on both the original Top Gun soundtrack album and the expanded edition. The song was also featured on Berlin's fourth studio album, Count Three & Pray and, as the band's biggest hit, on several of the band's compilation albums: Best of Berlin 1979–1988, Master Series, Greatest Hits Remixed (which includes a "Mission UK Remix" version), Live: Sacred & Profane, and Metro Greatest Hits. "Take My Breath Away" was one of the few songs not written by Berlin's John Crawford that they had performed on any album up to that point. Following the release of "Take My Breath Away", the band split over different points of view regarding the track: while Nunn viewed it as an opportunity that allowed the band to perform worldwide, Crawford disliked it as it had not been written or composed by any of them. He later said: "None of us had ever heard it. None of us had anything to do with it. I didn't play on it. Nobody played on it. No one wrote it".

"Take My Breath Away" was re-released in the United Kingdom in October 1990 to coincide with the first television showing of Top Gun (by ITV, on the evening of October 6, 1990), as well as Peugeot's new television advertising campaign for the 405 model range. The re-release reached number three on the UK Singles Chart.

In 2017, ShortLists Dave Fawbert listed the song as containing "one of the greatest key changes in music history".

Music video
The music video features scenes from the film Top Gun intermingled with Berlin's singer Terri Nunn performing the song in blue coveralls, walking between parts of planes in a windy aircraft boneyard (part of the Mojave Air & Space Port) at night. Bandmates John Crawford and Rob Brill are shown relaxing in the yard and then following Nunn. The video can be seen occasionally on VH1 Europe's Top 10 Movie Soundtracks program. It was later included on the 2004 Top Gun collector's edition DVD.

Track listings
7-inch single
A. "Take My Breath Away" – 4:13
B. "Radar Radio" (performed by Giorgio Moroder featuring Joe Pizzulo) – 3:40

UK 12-inch single
A. "Take My Breath Away" – 4:13
B1. "You've Lost That Lovin' Feelin'" (performed by The Righteous Brothers)
B2. "Radar Radio" (performed by Giorgio Moroder featuring Joe Pizzulo) – 3:40

UK 7-inch single (1990)
A. "Take My Breath Away" – 4:11
AA. "Danger Zone" (performed by Kenny Loggins) – 3:35

UK CD single (1990)
"Take My Breath Away" – 4:11
"Danger Zone" (performed by Kenny Loggins) – 3:35
"Hot Summer Nights" (performed by Miami Sound Machine) – 3:34
"Top Gun Anthem" (performed by Harold Faltermeyer and Steve Stevens) – 4:02

UK cassette single (1990)
A1. "Take My Breath Away" – 4:11
A2. "Danger Zone" (performed by Kenny Loggins) – 3:35
B1. "Take My Breath Away" – 4:11
B2. "Danger Zone" (performed by Kenny Loggins) – 3:35

Charts

Weekly charts

Year-end charts

Certifications

Jessica Simpson version

American singer Jessica Simpson covered "Take My Breath Away" and released it as the third single from the album In This Skin in March 2004. Her version was produced by Billy Mann. Simpson chose to cover this song because she thought that it was the theme song of her relationship with her then-husband, Nick Lachey.

Commercial performance
"Take My Breath Away" reached number 20 on the Billboard Hot 100, as well as the top 10 on the Top 40 Tracks and Top 40 Mainstream charts. It also became another number-one single for Simpson on the Hot 100 Singles Sales chart. On November 7, 2005, the song was certified gold by the Recording Industry Association of America (RIAA).

Track listings
 Original 2-track release
 "Take My Breath Away"
 "Fly"

 Australian CD single
 "Take My Breath Away"
 "With You" (acoustic version)
 "Take My Breath Away" (Eddie Baez Late Night Club Mix)
 "Take My Breath Away" (Passengerz Hourglass Mix)
 "Take My Breath Away" (music video)

 Brazilian promotional CD single
 "Take My Breath Away"
 "Take My Breath Away" (Eddie Baez Late Night Club Mix)
 "Take My Breath Away" (Eddie Baez Late Night Dub Mix)
 "Take My Breath Away" (Passengerz Hourglass Mix)

Awards and nominations

Charts

Weekly charts

Year-end charts

Certifications

Release history

The Shadows version
An instrumental version was recorded by The Shadows for their 1991 album Themes & Dreams. As is typical for the group's cover versions, it features Hank Marvin's lead guitar played to the original vocal melody, with considerable note elongation, echo and whammy bar application.

See also
 List of Dutch Top 40 number-one singles of 1986
 List of European number-one hits of 1986
 List of number-one singles of 1986 (Ireland)
 List of number-one singles from the 1980s (UK)
 List of Hot 100 number-one singles of 1986 (U.S.)

References

1980s ballads
1986 singles
1986 songs
2004 singles
Berlin (band) songs
Best Original Song Academy Award-winning songs
Best Original Song Golden Globe winning songs
Billboard Hot 100 number-one singles
Cashbox number-one singles
Columbia Records singles
Dutch Top 40 number-one singles
European Hot 100 Singles number-one singles
The Flying Pickets songs
Irish Singles Chart number-one singles
Jessica Simpson songs
Film theme songs
Love themes
Song recordings produced by Giorgio Moroder
Songs from Top Gun
Songs written by Giorgio Moroder
Songs written by Tom Whitlock
Synth-pop ballads
UK Singles Chart number-one singles